GEDCOM, complete name FamilySearch GEDCOM, is a de facto open file format specification to store genealogical data, and import or export it between compatible genealogy software. GEDCOM is an acronym standing for Genealogical Data Communication. GEDCOM was developed by the Church of Jesus Christ of Latter-day Saints (LDS Church) as an aid to genealogical research. Most genealogy software supports importing from and exporting to GEDCOM format.

As of version 7.0, a GEDCOM file is defined as UTF-8 encoded plain text. This file contains genealogical information about individuals such as names, events, and relationships; metadata links these records together. GEDCOM 7.0 is the first version to use semantic versioning, and is the most recent minor version of the specification.

The predecessor to 7.0, GEDCOM 5.5.1, was released as a draft in 1999. It has received only minor updates in the subsequent 20 years. The lack of updates to the standard and deficiencies in its capabilities began to see some genealogy programs add proprietary extensions to the format, which are not always recognized by other genealogy programs, such as the GEDCOM 5.5 EL (Extended Locations) specification. Other standards, such as GEDCOM X, have been suggested as complete replacements for GEDCOM.

GEDCOM 5.5.1 final, released in 2019, remains the industry's format standard for the exchange of genealogical data. With the release of GEDCOM 7.0 in 2021, however, a push is underway to see 7.0 adopted. FamilySearch intends to be GEDCOM 7.0 compatible in Quarter 3 of 2022, and Ancestry.com has 7.0 compatibility on its roadmap but has not yet specified an implementation date. FamilySearch GEDCOM has a GitHub repository

Model
GEDCOM uses a lineage-linked data model, with link emphasis on the nuclear family, and the individuals (children) produced by that family. These historical goals are described in the 7.0 specification document, "The FAM record was originally structured to represent families where a male HUSB (husband or father) and female WIFE (wife or mother) produce CHIL (children)."

The document goes on to say that these record types may be used more flexibly to reflect different family concepts. "The FAM record may also be used for cultural parallels to this, including nuclear families, marriage, cohabitation, fostering, adoption, and so on, regardless of the gender of the partners...The individuals pointed to by the HUSB and WIFE are collectively referred to as 'partners', 'parents' or 'spouses'."

File structure
A GEDCOM file consists of a header section, records, and a trailer section. Within these sections, records represent people (INDI record), families (FAM records), sources of information (SOUR records), and other miscellaneous records, including notes.  Every line of a GEDCOM file begins with a level number where all top-level records (HEAD, TRLR, SUBN, and each INDI, FAM, OBJE, NOTE, REPO, SOUR, and SUBM) begin with a line with level 0, while other level numbers are positive integers.

Although it is possible to write a GEDCOM file by hand, the format was designed to be used with software and thus is not especially human-friendly. A GEDCOM validator that can be used to validate the structure of a GEDCOM file is included as part of PhpGedView project, though it is not meant to be a standalone validator. For standalone validation "The Windows GEDCOM Validator" can be used. or the older unmaintained Gedcheck from the LDS Church.

During 2001, The GEDCOM TestBook Project evaluated how well four popular genealogy programs conformed to the GEDCOM 5.5 standard using the Gedcheck program. Findings showed that a number of problems existed and that "The most commonly found fault leading to data loss was the failure to read the NOTE tag at all the possible levels at which it may appear." In 2005, the Genealogical Software Report Card was evaluated (by Bill Mumford who participated in the original GEDCOM Testbook Project) and included testing the GEDCOM 5.5 standard using the Gedcheck program.

To assist with adoption of GEDCOM 7.0, validation tools now exist for that standard as well.

Example
The following is a sample GEDCOM file.

The header (HEAD) includes the source program and version (Personal Ancestral File, 5.0), the GEDCOM version (5.5), the character encoding (ANSEL), and a link to information about the submitter of the file.

The individual records (INDI) define John Smith (ID I1), Elizabeth Stansfield (ID I2), and James Smith (ID I3).

The family record (FAM) links the husband (HUSB), wife (WIFE), and child (CHIL) by their ID numbers.

Versions
The current version of the specification in wide use is GEDCOM 5.5.1 final, which was released on 15 November 2019.  Its predecessor, GEDCOM 5.5.1 draft was issued in 1999, introducing nine new attribute, tags and adding UTF-8 as an approved character encoding. The draft was not formally approved, but its provisions were adopted in some part by a number of genealogy programs including FamilySearch.org.

Lineage-linked GEDCOM is the deliberate de facto common denominator.  Despite version 5.5 of the GEDCOM standard first being published in 1996, many genealogical software suppliers have never fully supported the feature of multilingual Unicode text (instead of the ANSEL character set) introduced with that version of the specification. Uniform use of Unicode would allow for the usage of international character sets. An example is the storage of East Asian names in their original Chinese, Japanese and Korean (CJK) characters, without which they could be ambiguous and of little use for genealogical or historical research. PAF 5.2 is an example of software that uses UTF-8 as its internal character set, and can output a UTF-8 GEDCOM.

GEDCOM 7.0 requires UTF-8 encoding throughout, and resolves other long-standing issues with GEDCOM 5.5.1. Multimedia support in the form of an associated .zip file, called a GEDZip, is another inclusion. Efforts are underway to see 7.0 embraced as the new exchange standard. GEDCOM 7.0 allows explicitly identifying what standards other than GEDCOM may apply to a particular file. GEDCOM has always been extensible, but prior to 7.0 there was no standard way to identify such extensions. Also, GEDCOM allows explicitly marking an event as nonexistent. This allows, for example, documenting that a particular individual never married.

Release history

Limitations

Support for multi-person events and sources
A GEDCOM file can contain information on events such as births, deaths, census records, ship's records, marriages, etc.; a rule of thumb is that an event is something that took place at a specific time, at a specific place (even if time and place are not known).  GEDCOM files can also contain attributes such as physical description, occupation, and total number of children; unlike events, attributes generally cannot be associated with a specific time or place.

The GEDCOM specification requires that each event or attribute is associated with exactly one individual or family.  This causes redundancy for events such as census records where the actual census entry often contains information on multiple individuals.  In the GEDCOM file, for census records a separate census "CENS" event must be added for each individual referenced.  Some genealogy programs, such as Gramps and The Master Genealogist, have elaborate database structures for sources that are used, among other things, to represent multi-person events.  When databases are exported from one of these programs to GEDCOM, these database structures cannot be represented in GEDCOM due to this limitation, with the result that the event or source information including all of the relevant citation reference information must be duplicated each place that it is used.  This duplication makes it difficult for the user to maintain the information related to sources.

In the GEDCOM specification, events that are associated with a family such as marriage information is only stored in a GEDCOM once, as part of the family (FAM) record, and then both spouses are linked to that single family record.

Ambiguity in the specification
The GEDCOM specification was made purposefully flexible to support many ways of encoding data, particularly in the area of sources.  This flexibility has led to a great deal of ambiguity, and has produced the side effect that some genealogy programs which import GEDCOM do not import all of the data from a file.

Support for varying definitions of families and relationships
GEDCOM does not explicitly support data representation of many types of close interpersonal relationships, such as same-sex marriages, domestic partnerships, cohabitation, polyamory or polygamy. Such relationships can only be represented using the generic ASSO tag used for any type of relationship.

Ordering of events that do not have dates
The GEDCOM specification does not offer explicit support for keeping a known order of events. In particular, the order of relationships (FAMS) for a person and the order of the children within a relationship (FAM) can be lost. In many cases the sequence of events can be derived from the associated dates. But dates are not always known, in particular when dealing with data from centuries ago. For example, in the case that a person has had two relationships, both with unknown dates, but from descriptions it is known that the second one is indeed the second one. The order in which these FAMS are recorded in GEDCOM's INDI record will depend on the exporting program. In Aldfaer for instance, the sequence depends on the ordering of the data by the user (alphabetical, chronological, reference, etc.). The proposed XML GEDCOM standard does not address this issue either.

Lesser-known features
GEDCOM has many features that are not commonly used.  Some software packages do not support all the features that the GEDCOM standard allows.

Multimedia
The GEDCOM standard supports the inclusion of multimedia objects (for example, photos of individuals).  Such multimedia objects can be either included in the GEDCOM file itself (called the "embedded form") or in an external file where the name of the external file is specified in the GEDCOM file (called the "linked form").  Embedding multimedia directly in the GEDCOM file makes transmission of data easier, in that all of the information (including the multimedia data) is in one file, but the resulting file can be enormous.  Linking multimedia keeps the size of the GEDCOM file under control, but then when transmitting the file, the multimedia objects must either be transmitted separately or archived together with the GEDCOM into one larger file.   Support for embedding media directly was dropped in the draft 5.5.1 standard.

Conflicting information
The GEDCOM standard allows for the specification of multiple opinions or conflicting data, simply by specifying multiple records of the same type.  For example, if an individual's birth date was recorded as 10 January 1800 on the birth certificate, but 11 January 1800 on the death certificate, two BIRT records for that individual would be included, the first with the 10 January 1800 date and giving the birth certificate as the source, and the second with the 11 January 1800 date and giving the death certificate as the source. The preferred record is usually listed first.

This example encoded in GEDCOM might look like this:
 0 @I1@ INDI
 1 NAME John /Doe/
 1 BIRT
 2 DATE 10 JAN 1800
 2 SOUR @S1@
 3 DATA
 4 TEXT Transcription from birth certificate would go here
 3 NOTE This birth record is preferred because it comes from the birth certificate
 3 QUAY 2
 1 BIRT
 2 DATE 11 JAN 1800
 2 SOUR @S2@
 3 DATA
 4 TEXT Transcription from death certificate would go here
 3 QUAY 2

Conflicting data may also be the result of user errors. The standard does not specify in any way that the contents must be consistent. A birth date like "10 APR 1819" might mistakenly have been recorded as "10 APR 1918" long after the person's death. The only way to reveal such inconsistencies is by rigorous validation of the content data.

Internationalization
The GEDCOM standard supports internationalization in several ways.  First, newer versions of the standard allow data to be stored in Unicode (or, more recently, UTF-8), so text in any language can be stored.  Secondly, in the same way that you can have multiple events on a person, GEDCOM allows you to have multiple names for a person, so names can be stored in multiple languages (although there is no standardized way to indicate which instance is in which language).  Finally, in the latest version (5.5.1, not yet in widespread use), the NAME field also supports a phonetic variation (FONE) and a romanized variation (ROMN) of the name.

GEDCOM X
In February 2012 at the RootsTech 2012 conference, FamilySearch outlined a major new project around genealogical standards called GEDCOM X, and invited collaboration.
It includes software developed under the Apache open source license.  It includes data formats that facilitate basing family trees on sources and records (both physical artifacts and digital artifacts), support for sharing and linking data online, and an API.

In August 2012 FamilySearch employee and GEDCOM X project leader Ryan Heaton dropped the claim that GEDCOM X is the new industry standard, and repositioned GEDCOM X as another FamilySearch open source project.

After the release of GEDCOM 7, FamilySearch positioned GEDCOM X as useful for interoperation with its FamilySearch Family Tree software.

Alternatives
Commsoft, the authors of the Roots series of genealogy software and Ultimate Family Tree, defined a version called Event-Oriented GEDCOM (also known as "Event GEDCOM" and originally called InterGED), which included events as first class (zero-level) items.  Although it is event based, it is still a model built on assumed reality rather than evidence.  Event GEDCOM was more flexible, as it allowed some separation between believed events and the participants.  However, Event GEDCOM was not widely adopted by other developers due to its semantic differences.  With Roots and Ultimate Family Tree no longer available, very few people today are using Event GEDCOM.

Gramps XML is an XML-based open format created by the open source genealogy project Gramps and used also by PhpGedView.

The Family History Information Standards Organisation was established in 2012 with the aim of developing international standards for family history and genealogical information. One of the standards the organization proposed was Extended Legacy Format (ELF), compatible with GEDCOM 5.5(.1) but including an extensibility mechanism. The organization requested public comment on the proposed standard in 2017. It withdrew the proposal because release 7.0 of GEDCOM addressed many of the organization's concerns.

See also
FamilySearch
Ancestral File Number
International Genealogical Index
GENDEX – Genealogical index
Genealogical numbering systems
GNTP – Genealogy Network Transfer Protocol
Tiny Tafel Format – encoded "ancestor table"

References

External links
General
 GEDCOM Standard
 FamilySearch GEDCOM Guide
 GEDCOM X Project
 on LDS Church's Adoption of the XML Standard
 THE GEDCOM STANDARD Release 5.5.1, released 15. November 2019

Computer-related introductions in 1984
Computer file formats
Genealogy and the Church of Jesus Christ of Latter-day Saints
Genealogy software